Manipulator is a person who uses devious means to exploit, control, or otherwise influence others to their advantage.

Manipulator may also refer to:

 Manipulator (device), a device used to manipulate materials without direct contact
 Manipulator (insect), an extinct predatory cockroach
 Manipulator (The Fall of Troy album), 2007
 Manipulator (EP), an EP by Arsenal
 Manipulator (Ty Segall album), 2014

See also
 Manipulation (disambiguation)